Herman Page may refer to:

 Herman L. Page (1818–1873), merchant and mayor of Milwaukee, Wisconsin
 Herman Page (father) (1866–1942), fifth bishop of Episcopal Diocese of Michigan and fourth bishop of Episcopal Diocese of Northern Michigan
 Herman Page (son), fifth bishop of the Episcopal Diocese of Northern Michigan